The Taolin mine is a large mine located in the south-eastern China in Hunan. Taolin represents one of the largest fluorite reserves in China, having estimated reserves of 6.1 million tonnes of ore grading 14.3% fluorite.

References 

Fluorite mines in China